Dan Almagor (born 1935) is an Israeli playwright who has adapted and translated over a hundred plays for the Hebrew stage, including Shakespeare's "The Comedy of Errors", "As You Like It", "Fiddler on the Roof," "The King and I," "My Fair Lady" and "Guys and Dolls". 

Almagor (born Dan Shmuel Elblinger) was born in Ramat Gan, Mandatory Palestine, but grew up in Rehovot. His father was an agronomist who left Warsaw for Palestine in 1923.

His early songs, such as A Ballad for the Medic and Kol Ha’Kavod, celebrated Israeli macho culture and military heroism, but much of his later work is satiric and critical of Israeli society

References

1935 births
Living people
Israeli male dramatists and playwrights
Israeli translators
English–Hebrew translators
People from Rehovot